Almost Invisible is a live performance album by SubArachnoid Space, released on July 22, 1997, by Release Entertainment.

Track listing

Personnel 
Adapted from the Almost Invisible liner notes.

SubArachnoid Space
 Melynda Jackson – guitar
 Mason Jones – guitar, bass guitar
 Michelle Schreiber – percussion

Production and additional personnel
 Myles Boisen – mastering
 SubArachnoid Space – cover art

Release history

References

External links 
 Almost Invisible at Bandcamp
 Almost Invisible at Discogs (list of releases)

1997 live albums
SubArachnoid Space albums
Relapse Records albums